"Death or Freedom" was the national anthem of the Chechen Republic of Ichkeria, a former partially recognized separatist state in the North Caucasus from 1991 to 2000. The music was composed in 1992 by either Ali Dimayev or Umar Beksultanov, and the lyrics were written by Abuzar Aydamirov.

The Dudayev-era anthem replaced "My Checheno-Ingushetia", the anthem of the Checheno-Ingush Autonomous Soviet Socialist Republic, following the dissolution of the Soviet Union. Afterwards, "Joƶalla ya marşo" was replaced by "Shatlak's Song".

Lyrics

Notes

References

External links 
 Download in Mp3 (Copyright free)

See also 
 Shatlak's Song

Chechen nationalism
Chechen Republic of Ichkeria
Regional songs
Chechen
Chechnya
Russian anthems
National anthems
National anthem compositions in G minor